Pocrnela burma (English: My Wedding Ring Turned Black) is the tenth studio album by Bosnian Serb singer Indira Radić, released in 2002.

The song "Ratovanje" borrows the music of the hit 1998 song "Mundian To Bach Ke", by Indian singer, Labh Janjua.

Track listing
Pocrnela burma
Dužan si mi dva života
Lopov (duet with Alen Islamović)
Izdao me neko
Kaži kako živiš
Ratovanje
Agonija
Preko preko
Sve su iste pesme moje
Uzmi sve mi uzmi

References

2002 albums
Indira Radić albums
Grand Production albums